The Lavant is a river in the Austrian state of Carinthia, a left tributary of the Drava. It lends its name to the Lavanttal valley as well as to the Lavanttal Alps.

It then runs southeastwards and after  reaches the border with Carinthia. The river flows down the Lavanttal with the towns of Bad Sankt Leonhard, Wolfsberg and Sankt Andrä, until it reaches the Drava shortly before it crosses the border to Slovenia.

The water quality has been affected by large-scale river regulations between the 1930s and 1980s.  Most parts of the Lavant belong to the trout zone, while the lowest sections are characterised by barbels.

The name Lavant stems from the Pre-Celtic period, meaning "shining river" in Indo-European.

References

Rivers of Carinthia (state)
Tributaries of the Danube
Rivers of Austria